Waikato is an electorate in the New Zealand Parliament. A Waikato electorate was first created in 1871 and an electorate by this name has existed from 1871 to 1963, 1969 to 1996, and 2008 to the present, though exact borders have often changed.

The Waikato electorate is represented by Tim van de Molen for the National Party, who has held the seat since the 2017 general election.

Geography

The Waikato electorate, whose borders were last altered in 2020, is in the Waikato region and includes largely rural areas to the north and the west of the city of Hamilton. The Waikato River flows along near its southern boundary then travels north through the electorate. It includes small portions of the outskirts of Hamilton and Cambridge. Towns within the electorate include Morrinsville, Huntly, and Matamata, each of which have populations around 8,000.

In a piece for the 2020 election, journalist Tom Rowland described the area as "one of the country's most vital regions, home to farmers and agricultural industries that continue to hold New Zealand's economy steady in the wake of the Covid-19 pandemic". Rowland considered it to be a key area for future economic development, calling it "the key to activating the Golden Triangle between Auckland, Hamilton and Tauranga." He also noted that it was the birthplace of both Jacinda Ardern and Judith Collins, the Prime Minister and the Leader of the Opposition, respectively, at the 2020 election.

History

Creation and seat holders prior to 1938 
James McPherson was elected, but he resigned the same year, on 20 December. William Jackson won the resulting . Jackson retired at the end of the parliamentary term in 1875. Frederick Whitaker won 5 January 1876 election.

The Waikato electorate was won by John Blair Whyte in the 1879 election, who served for eleven years until 1890 when he retired. Whyte was appointed to the Legislative Council in the following year. The resulting  was won by Edward Lake, who retired at the end of the parliamentary term in 1893.

The  was won by Alfred Cadman for the Liberal Party, who had been an MP in various electorates since 1881. Greenslade held the electorate until 1911, when he was defeated by the Reform candidate Alexander Young.

Young was succeeded by the Liberal candidate Frederick Lye in the Waikato electorate in 1922.

1938 onward 
Since 1938, the Waikato electorate (when it has existed) has always been held by a National Party member. This trend has lasted through 2020, when the seat was retained by National MP Tim van de Molen. Other electorates which covered parts of this region have also strongly supported National. The electorates of Piako, Matamata, and Karapiro were entirely National-held during their time as electorates, the Hamilton electorate was held by National from 1943 until it was dissolved in 1969, and the Waipa electorate was held by National from 1954 until its dissolution in 1996.

Goosman was succeeded in Waikato by Geoffrey Sim in 1946. Sim held the electorate until it was abolished in 1963, when he contested Piako instead.

The Waikato electorate was re-established in 1969 following the Electoral Act of 1965, which led to substantial changes in the number, shape, and size of electorates across the country. The first representative was National's Lance Adams-Schneider, who had previously represented the Hamilton electorate. Adams-Schneider retired from Parliament in 1981 and became Ambassador of New Zealand to the United States in the following year. Storey held the electorate until it was abolished again in the electorate changes that came with the introduction of Mixed-member proportional voting in 1996.

The Waikato electorate was re-established in 2006 for the 2008 election.

The seat was won by Tim van de Molen, retaining it for the National Party, who won it again in 2020.

The most recent boundary changes to Waikato occurred in 2020, when more area was added in its north and its south, as well as areas just outside Hamilton and Cambridge.

Three of the five National Party members of parliament for Waikato were cabinet ministers.

Members of Parliament
Key

List MPs
Members of Parliament elected from party lists in elections where that person also unsuccessfully contested the Waikato electorate. Unless otherwise stated, all MPs terms began and ended at general elections.

Election results

2020 election

2017 election

2014 election

2011 election

Electorate (as at 26 November 2011): 42,084

2008 election

1935 election

 
 
 
 
 
 
 
 

Table footnotes:

1931 election

 
 
 
 

 

Table footnotes:

1928 election

1908 election

1899 election

1891 by-election

Notes

References

Bibliography

External links
Electorate map from Elections NZ
1870 description of boundaries
1902 map
1911 map (page 29) and description of boundaries
1917 map (page 27) and description of boundaries
1937 map
1946 map

New Zealand electorates
Politics of Waikato
1870 establishments in New Zealand
1969 establishments in New Zealand
2008 establishments in New Zealand
1963 disestablishments in New Zealand
1996 disestablishments in New Zealand